Highland High School is a public high school in Bakersfield, California, United States, providing technology-based instruction across the curriculum. Advanced Placement (AP) and Honors classes are offered for juniors and seniors in English, calculus, statistics, math analysis, U.S. History, government/economics, chemistry, physics, psychology, geology, environmental science, Spanish, and French. Starting in 2015, they offered AP World History to sophomores. The school offers a college preparatory and GATE/Honors program which includes four years of English, four years of mathematics through calculus, four years of Spanish and French, three years of social studies including world civilizations, U.S. history, U.S. government, and economics, and three years of science chosen from biology, earth science, chemistry, and physics.

Approximately 10 percent of Highland's graduates go directly to a four-year college or university with an additional 40 percent attending community and technical colleges. The fine arts department provides a wide variety of enrichment courses including orchestra, intermediate and advanced band (Symphonic Band and Wind Ensemble), five choirs, beginning, intermediate, and advanced arts/crafts, as well as beginning, intermediate, and advanced drama/theater studies. Forensics (public speaking) and journalism/ publications are taught through the English department. Additionally, Highland offers two four-year Project Lead the Way programs: engineering and biomedicine. Students are highly encouraged to participate in extra-curricular activities and in athletics. Highland provides more than 30 clubs and 32 athletic teams. Highland has an Academic Decathlon team which typically places in the top five teams each year in the county competition and a Science Bowl team that has won the regional competition and represented the region in the national competition several times. Highland's athletic teams are competitive. Highland's students are active in community service, typically among the top schools in the highest percentage of eligible donors giving blood.

Highland High School, located in the northeast part of Bakersfield, serves a multi-cultural population of more than 2,000 students drawn from three distinct eastside neighborhoods, two of which are uniquely "island" areas outside the immediate school neighborhood from which Highland draws approximately 53% of its students. Career-technical education courses that are offered at the school include agriculture, computer applications and CAD/drafting. The CAD/drafting classes focus on architectural design, qualify for UC fine arts credit, and are articulated with Bakersfield College. Highland's drafting students compete each year in the California State Fair; the 2006 competition resulted in 8 student ribbons won and another 7 Honorable Mention awards given. Highland's agriculture program is outstanding and produced the state science project winner who will be one of eight semi-finalists who will present their projects at the national Future Farmers of America Conference in October. Highland's music programs are well known throughout the county and state.

Highland is proud to be the county site for the deaf and hard-of-hearing program and now includes five periods of elective classes in American Sign Language (ASL) for its students. Highland offers a variety of programs including Special Education, Title One, English Learner, Migrant PASS, Independent Study, and Work Experience. Literacy classes are offered to incoming freshmen whose skills need to be strongly supported for improved academic success and supplemental classes in English and math are offered to accommodate students who have not passed the California High School Exit Exam (CAHSEE).

Music program 
Highland High School has an instrumental music program. They offer five music courses during the day: marching band (fall), symphonic band and wind ensemble (spring), string orchestra, and a guitar class, as well as a zero period percussion class and an eighth period jazz band.

Advanced band
The advanced band has a marching season that starts with band camp two weeks before regular classes start and runs through mid-November. Then, they switch to playing indoor concert music. The marching band is known as the Black Watch Brigade, a tribute to the Royal Highland Regiment. The Black Watch Brigade performs a field show at various marching band competitions throughout the state each year. Additionally, they perform at home and away football games. Their ensemble consists of the marching band, zero period drumline and auxiliary percussion, and color guard. The number of members has grown substantially over the last few years, resulting in the group being reclassified and moved up a division.

Notable alumni
 Gregory Porter - multiple Grammy-winning jazz singer
 Nicole Parra - California State Assemblywoman
Jonathan Davis - lead singer of Korn
 Reginald Arvizu - bassist of Korn
 Kris Kohls - drummer of Adema
 Michael Lockwood - guitarist, was married to Lisa Marie Presley
 Derek Mears - actor
 Robert Swift - basketball player (transferred to Bakersfield High School)
 Brian Welch - guitarist of Korn

References

External links 
 Highland High School Website

High schools in Bakersfield, California
Educational institutions established in 1972
Public high schools in California
1972 establishments in California